Gender lens investing is the practice of investing for financial return while also considering the benefits to women, both through improving economic opportunities, and through securing the social well being of girls and women.  The term was coined around 2009 and became an increasingly popular practice in the mid-2010s.

Gender lens investing can include funding women-owned businesses, businesses with a strong track record of employing women, or companies that improve the lives of women and girls with their products and services. Sarah Kaplan and Jackie VanderBurg of U.S. Trust wrote of the practice that "Women launching and expanding ventures around the world have an estimated collective credit gap of $320 billion (the difference between the capital they are seeking and the credit to which they have access), which creates a major opportunity for investors."

History
An early example of gender lens investing was the Valeurs Feminines fund, created by the French money-management firm Conseil Plus Gestion in 2005 to invest in women-owned and women-led European businesses. Firms that later offered a gender lens investment strategy for some of their portfolios included Morgan Stanley, Merrill Lynch, Goldman Sachs, U.S. Trust, Root Capital, Veris Wealth Partners, Illuminate Ventures, Trillium Asset Management, Gray Matters Capital, Golden Seeds, and the Calvert Foundation. In November 2013, Joy Anderson of the Criterion Institute organized a summit for gender lens investors in Hartford, Connecticut.

In 2017 National Bank of Australia announced that it had sold AUD$500 million gender equity bonds. The bonds invest in a portfolio of businesses which have received a gender citation from Australian Government body the Workplace Gender Equality Agency.

Returns
Like other forms of impact investing, it can be challenging to find large opportunities for direct investment in gender lens investing. Portfolios therefore often consist of many small deals, which can be unwieldy or time-consuming to assemble. Critics of the practice also argue that it asks investors to give up some of the returns they could expect from a gender-neutral investment strategy.

Supporters of gender lens investing argue that firms with a higher-than-average proportion of women in executive roles tend to perform well, possibly because of an increased diversity of viewpoints or because not discriminating against women allows companies to hire the best available talent. Business Insider wrote of gender lens investing in 2015 that "It is a proven theory as most of the women-focused funds and investment strategies - a tiny slice of the $6.6 trillion-socially responsible investing world - have been standout performers over the years." According to The Guardian, women in microcredit programs also tend to have higher repayment rates than men. 

A Review commissioned by the UK Treasury found that supporting female entrepreneurs could generate as much as $250bn for the UK economy. Businesses run by women were less likely, the report found, to deliver a turnover of more than £1bn. Supporting entrepreneurs would help to close this gap. 

Joann Weiner of the Washington Post wrote more skeptically of the strategy's ability to deliver above average returns: "Like all the rest, the 'gender lens' strategy will have its good times, and it will have its hard times... follow a 'gender lens' investment strategy if it makes you feel good. Just don’t count on making a killing in the market if you do."

References

External links
Joy Anderson on gender lens investing
Patricia Farrar-Rivas on gender lens investing

Investment
Women's empowerment